Chainarong Tathong (born 31 January 1987), simply known as Bie is a Thai retired professional footballer who plays as a striker.

Personal life
Chainarong's brother, Wuttichai Tathong, is also a footballer as a striker.

Club career

At BBCU, Chainarong was the 2010 Thai Division 1 League top scorer with 19 goals. Muangthong United bought him from BBCU in 2012. In 2013, he was loaned to Army United. In the second leg of the 2013 Thai Premier League, Chainarong came back to Muangthong after impressive form with Army United. He scored his first Muangthong United goal against Samut Songkhram. Later in the season, Chainarong scored his second goal for Muangthong against Suphanburi, marking his first goal at SCG Stadium. In recent seasons, he has again gone out on loan from Muangthong, spending 2015 with Osotspa Samut Prakan. He started 2016 on loan with BEC Tero Sasana, and is currently at PTT Rayong.

International career

Chainarong was called up to the national team for the 2015 AFC Asian Cup qualification against Kuwait and Iran, but didn't get a chance to play. Chainarong was also part of Thailand's squad in the 2014 AFF Suzuki Cup.

International

Honours

International
Thailand
 ASEAN Football Championship (1): 2014

Individual
 Thai Division 1 League Top Scorer (1): 2010

References

External links

1987 births
Living people
Chainarong Tathong
Chainarong Tathong
Association football forwards
Chainarong Tathong
Chainarong Tathong
Chainarong Tathong
Chainarong Tathong
Chainarong Tathong
Chainarong Tathong
Chainarong Tathong
Chainarong Tathong
Chainarong Tathong
Chainarong Tathong